Alexandro Pozzer (born 21 December 1988) is a Brazilian handball player for CSM București and the Brazilian national team.

References

External links

1988 births
Living people
Brazilian male handball players
Brazilian expatriate sportspeople in Spain
Brazilian expatriate sportspeople in Romania
Expatriate handball players
Liga ASOBAL players
Handball players at the 2016 Summer Olympics
Olympic handball players of Brazil
Handball players at the 2015 Pan American Games
Handball players at the 2019 Pan American Games
Pan American Games medalists in handball
Pan American Games gold medalists for Brazil
Pan American Games bronze medalists for Brazil
People from Caxias do Sul
South American Games gold medalists for Brazil
South American Games medalists in handball
Competitors at the 2018 South American Games
Medalists at the 2015 Pan American Games
Medalists at the 2019 Pan American Games
Sportspeople from Rio Grande do Sul
21st-century Brazilian people